Lenny Montana (born Leonardo Passafaro; March 13, 1926 – May 12, 1992) was an American actor who played the role of feared hitman Luca Brasi in The Godfather. Prior to becoming an actor, he had a successful career as a professional wrestler and worked as an enforcer for the Colombo crime family.

Biography

Early life and early wrestling career
Montana was born in Brooklyn, New York, on March 13, 1926. He was of Italian-American heritage. He was fluent in both English and Italian. His wrestling career began in neighboring New Jersey in 1953. He wrestled under the Zebra Kid gimmick, and was billed at the height of 6'6". It wasn't long before Montana found success. Along with Golden Terror, he won the New Jersey Tag Team titles on April 4, 1953. He began to travel, wrestling in the Midwest. He soon won the NWA Central States Heavyweight Championship, defeating Dave Sims on October 1, 1953, in Kansas City. However he lost the title on December 11, 1953, to Sonny Myers, who had previously held the title three times before defeating the Zebra Kid. Montana's final success of the 1950s came in 1956, winning the NWA Texas Tag Team Championship with Gene Kiniski, defeating Herb Freeman and Ray Gunkel on September 18 in Dallas under the alias Len Crosby. He also worked as a bouncer during this time to earn extra money.

Later wrestling career
By the late 1950s, Montana was on the road with the Carnival Circuit as a wrestler. As a popular wrestler on the circuit, Montana met the then unknown Eddie Sharkey in 1960. The two struck up a friendship. After seeing what Sharkey could do, Montana recommended that he try his hand at professional wrestling. Montana also clued in Sharkey on the then-unacknowledged truth about professional wrestling—that all the outcomes are predetermined. Later that year, Montana won the NWA Texas World Tag Team titles with Joe Christie, under the Len Crosby name. Then with Hard Boiled Haggerty, he won the AWA World Tag Team Championship on October 4, 1960, defeating Stan Kowalski and Tiny Mills (wrestling as Murder Inc.) in Minneapolis.

In a match against Verne Gagne, Montana suffered a broken leg, forcing Haggerty to choose a new partner. After recovering from his injury, in 1961 Montana began to wrestle in Florida. He came to the Tampa Bay area and began to wrestle under The Zebra Kid alias. At his great size, he would often pin his opponents in under one minute. The Zebra Kid had a notable feud with Eddie Graham; their battles sold out Fort Homer Hesterly Armory many Tuesday nights in 1961. Things came to a head when Montana defeated Eddie Graham in a NWA Southern Heavyweight Championship (Georgia version) title match on May 1, 1962. 

On November 23, 1962, he won the NWA (Georgia) Southern Tag Team Titles with his partner Gypsy Joe, defeating 'Grizzly' Jake Smith and Luke Brown. Montana then went on to form a powerful partnership with Tarzan Tyler, in which they would win three titles. First, the NWA International Tag Team Titles on April 9, 1963 defeating Ted Evans and Chief Little Eagle, then again winning the NWA International Tag Team Titles later in June 1963, defeating billed champions Chief Little Eagle and Dick Steinborn. Finally, the duo won the NWA World Tag Team Championship in Georgia, during October 1963, they defeated Karl Von Brauner and Kurt Von Brauner. Montana was due to be Gorilla Monsoon's tag team partner in 1964, but at the last minute Monsoon took on The African Savage as his partner instead. Montana had been interested in acting and was meeting with casting agents in Los Angeles at the same time he was due to team up with Bison. Montana began to wrestle less and less, and went into semi-retirement; however he appeared in matches up until his acting career took off in the early 1970s.

Working for the Colombo crime family
Montana became involved with the Colombo crime family in the late 1960s. Tall and very heavily built, his talents were mostly as an enforcer and an arsonist. He told the cast and crew of The Godfather how he would tie a tampon to the tail of a mouse, dip it in kerosene, light it, and let the mouse run through a building, or he would put a lit candle in front of a cuckoo clock so that when the clock's bird would pop out the candle would be knocked over and start a fire. Eventually, Montana was jailed at Rikers Island. Upon being released, Montana acted as a bodyguard for many senior members of the Colombo family.

Work on The Godfather
The filming of The Godfather faced strong opposition from the Italian-American Civil Rights League, with disputes headed by Joe Colombo and Frank Sinatra threatening its whole production. Producer Al Ruddy eventually made a deal with the league and Joe Colombo to cut the word Mafia (which was only used once in the script) and the League would back the production of the film. This meant mobsters would be present on the set of The Godfather. In 1971, when Montana was acting as a bodyguard for a senior Colombo family member, he met Francis Ford Coppola and Al Ruddy. After being introduced to the 6'6" 320-pound Montana, they quickly cast him for the role of Luca Brasi. When Bettye McCartt, Al Ruddy's assistant, broke her watch, Montana offered to get her a new one. A week later, Montana returned with a "gift from the boys" – an antique diamond watch. He was picked for the part after the original actor playing the character died of a stroke. This was his first credited film appearance. Montana was very nervous about appearing opposite Brando. Director Coppola incorporated this real-life tension into several scenes, showing Brasi repeatedly practicing (and later fumbling) his congratulations to Corleone. Montana had little screen time in the film (although his final scene is one of the most suspenseful in the film), but his notable height and physique caught the eye of producers, and he appeared in several movies and television programs after appearing in The Godfather.

Film and TV career
One of the first of these roles was the Italian spoof film The Funny Face of the Godfather in 1973. Montana had the role of Saro, and an artist's rendition of Montana appeared on the film's poster. He established himself as an efficient character actor and appeared in Patty (1976), Fingers (1978) as the pizzeria owner Luchino, Matilda (1978), They Went That-A-Way & That-A-Way (1978), The Jerk (1979), Seven (1979), Below the Belt (1980), Defiance (1980), Battle Creek Brawl (1980) alongside Jackie Chan, Evilspeak (1981), ...All the Marbles (1981), Pandemonium (1982) and Blood Song (1982). He also acted on television as well as the big screen, appearing in Search (1973), Strike Force (1975), which starred a young Richard Gere, Contract on Cherry Street (1977), which featured Frank Sinatra, Kojak (1978), and Magnum, P.I. (1982). Montana was usually cast as "muscle" for hire or an intimidating mobster.

Retirement and later life
Montana retired from acting after appearing in the B movie Blood Song (1982), which he also co-wrote. He died May 12, 1992, of a heart attack in Lindenhurst, New York. He was 66 years old.

Montana is portrayed by Lou Ferrigno in the 2022 miniseries, The Offer.

Filmography

Championships and accomplishments
American Wrestling Association
AWA World Tag Team Championship (1 time) – with Hard Boiled Haggerty
Central States Wrestling
NWA Central States Heavyweight Championship (1 time)
Georgia Championship Wrestling
NWA Southern Heavyweight Championship (Georgia version) (1 time)
NWA International Tag Team Championship (Georgia version) (2 times) – with Tarzan Tyler
NWA Southern Tag Team Championship (Georgia version) (1 time) – with Gypsy Joe
NWA World Tag Team Championship (Georgia version) (1 time) – with Tarzan Tyler
Southwest Sports, Inc.
NWA Texas Tag Team Championship (1 time) – with Gene Kiniski
NWA World Tag Team Championship (Texas version) (1 time) – with Joe Christie

References

External links 
 
 
 
 
 
 

1926 births
1992 deaths
20th-century American male actors
American male film actors
American male professional wrestlers
American male television actors
American professional wrestlers of Italian descent
Colombo crime family
Faux Native American professional wrestlers
Male actors from New York City
People from Brooklyn
People from Lindenhurst, New York
Sportspeople from New York City
20th-century professional wrestlers
AWA World Tag Team Champions
Professional wrestlers from New York City
WCWA Brass Knuckles Champions